Pablita Abeyta (Diné name: Ta-Nez-Bah) (1953 – 2017) was a Native American (Navajo Nation) activist and sculptor born in Gallup, New Mexico, United States. The eldest daughter of Sylvia Ann (Shipley) Abeyta and artist Narciso Abeyta. Her family was originally from the Cañoncito ("small canyon" in Spanish) Band of the Navajo Reservation in New Mexico, located west of Albuquerque. In 2000 the reservation decided to change its name to To’Hajiilee ("drawing up water from a natural well" in Navajo).

Abeyta earned a Master's in Public Affairs from the University of New Mexico and "worked as a lobbyist for the Navajo Nation in Washington, D.C."

Early life
Pablita Abeyta was born in Gallup, New Mexico on July 20, 1953. Both her parents were artists; her father was Narciso Abeyta and her mother was Sylvia Ann (Shipley) Abeyta. Abeyta was one of seven children. Each child is artistically skilled, in skills ranging from weaving or creating sculptures and painting. Each child was given a Navajo middle name, with the goal of keeping the children connected to their Native American heritage. Abeyta's Navajo name, "Ta-Nez-Bah," translates as "One Who Completes a Circle."

Career

Activism
Abeyta earned her Master of Public Affairs from the University of New Mexico in 1983. After earning her degree, she became a lobbyist for the Navajo Nation Washington, D.C. office. As a lobbyist for the Navajo, she coordinated a national effort to secure the passing of amendments related to Native peoples such as the Safe Drinking Water Act, Clean Water Act, and the Superfund act. From 1986 to 1988, Abeyta was a legislative assistant for Ben Nighthorse Campbell, a Democrat in the House of Representatives at this time. She left Campbell's office in 1988 to join the Bureau of Indian Affairs. In 1991, she became a congressional liaison for the National Museum of the American Indian (NMAI). At NMAI she monitored the planned museum's funding and participated in obtaining funding for the Smithsonian Institution, NMAI'S organizational parent.  She had also worked in developing proposals related to the cultural repatriation. She had also served as the special assistant to the director of the museum in the office of Government affairs.  She served as a liaison with fundraising for the museum, and also coordinated the attendance of tribal leaders at opening ceremonies as a member of the Native Nations procession team.

Art
As an artist, Abeyta created sculptures that are described as "smooth, round and sensuous." Her work is held in numerous private and public collections, including those of John McCain, Daniel Inouye, NMAI and the National Museum of Natural History. Abeyta's first piece to be auctioned came after her death in 2020. Her "untitled, two corn maidens" was auctioned at Cowan's Cincinnati 2020.

References

Native American sculptors
National Museum of the American Indian
Navajo artists
People from Gallup, New Mexico
University of New Mexico alumni
American women sculptors
1953 births
Living people
Native American women artists
21st-century American women artists
20th-century Native Americans
21st-century Native Americans
20th-century Native American women
21st-century Native American women